Qianjiang may refer to:

Qianjiang District, Chongqing
Qianjiang, Hubei, sub-prefecture-level city
Qianjiang Century City, Xiaoshan District, Hangzhou, Zhejiang
Qianjiang, Guangxi, town in and subdivision of Xingbin District, Laibin
Qianjiang (922–979), a former county in modern Hangzhou, Zhejiang, administered by Hang Prefecture

Rivers
Qian River, a short section of the Xi River system in Guangxi
Qiantang River, also called Qianjiang, in Zhejiang, emptying into Hangzhou Bay

Others
Qianjiang Motorcycle, a motorcycle manufacturer based in Taizhou, Zhejiang, China
Qianjiang Evening News, a newspaper based in Hangzhou, Zhejiang, China